The 1946–47 Wisconsin Badgers men's basketball team represented University of Wisconsin–Madison. The head coach was Harold E. Foster, coaching his thirteenth season with the Badgers. The team played their home games at the UW Fieldhouse in Madison, Wisconsin and was a member of the Big Nine Conference.

Schedule

|-
!colspan=12| Regular Season

|-
!colspan=12| NCAA Tournament

References

Wisconsin Badgers men's basketball seasons
Wisconsin
Wisc
Wisc